Stilifer astericola is a parasitic sea snail, a marine gastropod mollusk in the taxonomic family Eulimidae. It is the type species of the genus Stilifer.

The species was discovered in the Malay Archipelago by Hugh Cuming. It was found burrowing in different parts of the oral disc of Heliaster cumingi.

References

Eulimidae
Gastropods described in 1832